This article lists political parties in Slovenia. Since 1989, Slovenia has a multi-party system with numerous political parties, in which one party rarely has a chance of gaining power alone, and parties must work with each other forming coalitions.

Parliamentary parties

Extra-parliamentary parties

Historical parties
Slovene People's Party (1892–1945), conservative political party
National Progressive Party (1894–1919), liberal political party
Yugoslav Social-Democratic Party (1898–1919), left-wing political party
Independent Agrarian Party (1919–1926), liberal agrarian political party
Slovene Peasant Party (1926–1929), centre-right agrarian political party
League of Communists / Communist Party (1937–1990), left-wing to far-left party
Union of Reform Forces (1989–1990), centre to centre-left political party
Slovene Christian Democrats (1989–2000), centre-right to right-wing political party
Slovenian Democratic Union (1989–1993), centrist and liberal political party
Socialist Party of Slovenia (1990–1993), centre-left political party
Democratic Party of Slovenia (1992–2007), centrist political party
Party of Slovenian People (1994–2008), right-wing to far-right political party
Slovenia is Ours (2004–2011), centrist regionalist political party
Active Slovenia (2004–2007), centrist and liberal political party 
Zares – Social Liberals (2007–2015), centre to centre-left political party
Gregor Virant's Civic List (2011–2018), centre to centre-right political party
United Left - Democratic Party of Work (2014–2017), left-wing political party
List of Marjan Šarec (2014–2022), centre to centre-left party
Party of Alenka Bratušek (2014–2022), centre to centre-left party
Verjamem (2014–2022), centre to centre-left party

See also
 Politics of Slovenia
 List of political parties by country to browse parties by country

References

External links
  Iskalnik političnih strank [Political Party Search Engine]. Search term in the field "Ime stranke": *. Ministry of Interior Affairs, Republic of Slovenia. Accessed 22 January 2012.
  Seznam davčnih zavezancev [A List of Taxpayers]. Search term: 94.920 (main activity: political organisation). Računovodja.com. Accessed 22 January 2012.

 
Slovenia
Political parties
 
Slovenia
Political parties